The 2015 Texas Longhorns football team, known variously as "Texas", "UT", the "Longhorns", or the "Horns", was a collegiate American football team that represented the University of Texas at Austin as a member of the Big 12 Conference in the 2015 NCAA Division I FBS football season. The team played its home games at Darrell K Royal–Texas Memorial Stadium in Austin, Texas, where the team is based. The Longhorns were led by second-year head coach Charlie Strong. Shawn Watson and Joe Wickline ran the offense. Vance Bedford served as defensive coordinator. They finished the season 5–7, 4–5 in Big 12 play to finish in a three-way tie for fifth place.

Preseason

In 2014, first-year head coach Charlie Strong led the Texas Longhorns to a 6–7 record, including a 5–4 record in conference play and a 7–31 loss against Arkansas in the 2014 Texas Bowl. In the aftermath of the bowl game, Strong described it as well as a 10–48 loss to TCU a month prior an "embarrassment to the program" and stated that a competition between players for the quarterback position as well as other positions was needed to improve the team as a whole after quarterback Tyrone Swoopes received heavy criticism following the game. On December 31, 2014, then-tight ends coach Bruce Chambers and wide receivers coach Les Koenning were released from their coaching duties. Bruce Chambers had been the only coach to have been retained following Charlie Strong's hire earlier in 2014. On January 16, 2015, the Longhorns hired former Oklahoma wide receivers coach Jay Norvell to the same position at Texas. Norvell had been fired from Oklahoma earlier that month following the fallout from the 2014 Russell Athletic Bowl.

On February 6, less than two days after National Signing Day, defensive-line coach Chris Rumph left Texas to coach the same position at the Florida Gators after just one season with the Longhorns. A week later, Texas hired Brick Haley and Jeff Traylor to fill the team's coaching vacancies at the defensive-line and tight end. Haley was the defensive-line coach at LSU at the time of hire and had previously coached the same position with the Chicago Bears, Mississippi State, and several other schools. Traylor was previously a 15-year head coach at Gilmer High School, where he amassed three state championship titles.

Spring game

Recruiting

A total of 28 players pledged non-binding commitments to the 2015 Texas Longhorns football team during the 2015 recruiting cycle. However, these players would not officially become part of the team until they signed their National Letter of Intent on National Signing Day, which occurred on February 4, 2015. However, junior college recruits could sign earlier, and as a result all three of Texas' junior college prospects signed their letters of intent on December 17, 2014 and became the first recruits to sign on the Longhorns' 2015 recruiting class. Six players joined the Longhorns as early enrollees, meaning that they would be able to train with the team during the spring of 2015. One player did not sign with the team and instead elected to grayshirt, meaning that they would not be officially part of the team or receive financial aid from the athletic department until the spring semester of 2016 (on August 7, 2015, after more scholarships became available, Merrick was offered an immediate full scholarship). The first player to commit was offensive guard Patrick Vahe, who committed on July 28, 2013. Three commits came from a players in either junior or community colleges, while the rest came from high schools.

Of Texas' 29 commitments, 14 were listed on the ESPN 300, which lists the 300 top recruiting prospects nationwide according to the network's metrics. According to ESPN, Rivals.com, Scout.com, and 247Sports.com, linebacker Malik Jefferson was the Longhorns' highest rated prospect; Jefferson was considered the third best linebacker nationwide and fifth best prospect overall in Texas. Three players announced their commitments to Texas at two nationally televised high school all-star games, including one at the 2015 Under Armour All-America Game held on January 2, 2015 and two from the 2015 US Army All-American Bowl held the following day. Among Texas' recruits in 2015 were a group of five players from Florida who visited Texas in 2014 as they played West Virginia in Austin. Given the moniker of the "Florida Five", the five—Cecil Cherry, Devonaire Clarington, Davante Davis, Tim Irvin, and Gilbert Johnson—were heavily sought after during the recruiting process and were all eventually committed to Texas by January 4, 2015. However, Tim Irvin would decommit from Texas on January 18 and Gilbert Johnson was unable to gain academic eligibility for The University of Texas. Throughout the recruiting process, five players revoked their former Texas-commit status. However, one recruit, John Burt, recommitted to Texas on January 26, 2015.

Texas' 2015 recruiting class was ranked 9th, 12th, 7th, and 10th by ESPN, Rivals.com, Scout.com, and 247Sports.com, respectively. These rankings also placed Texas as having the best recruiting class in the Big 12 Conference.

Recruits

Personnel

Roster

Depth chart

Schedule

Game summaries

at Notre Dame

vs. Rice

vs. California

vs. Oklahoma State

2016 NFL draftees

References

Texas
Texas Longhorns football seasons
Texas Longhorns football